is a Japanese footballer who plays for Montedio Yamagata.

Club statistics
Updated to 26 July 2022.

References

External links

Profile at Renofa Yamaguchi FC

1993 births
Living people
Biwako Seikei Sport College alumni
Association football people from Nara Prefecture
Japanese footballers
J2 League players
Japan Football League players
Renofa Yamaguchi FC players
SP Kyoto FC players
Zweigen Kanazawa players
Montedio Yamagata players
Association football midfielders